The Western Transportation Advisory Council (WESTAC) is a non-profit organization of major transportation organizations in Western Canada, represented by business, labour, and government decision-makers   The members focus on critical issues that affect Western Canada's freight transportation network to ensure that it is safe, efficient, reliable and competitive. WESTAC was founded in 1973 by four western provincial transport ministers, Fred Peacock, Alex MacDonald, Leonard Evans, and Roy Romanow.  WESTAC's present Chair is Saskatchewan's Minister of Highways and Minister Responsible for Saskatchewan Water Security Agency, Hon. Jeremy Cockrill. Lindsay Kislock is the President and CEO of WESTAC.

References

External links 
WESTAC Homepage

Transport in Canada